Younuo (also spelled Yuno,  yōunuò;) is a divergent Hmongic language spoken in Longsheng Various Nationalities Autonomous County, Guangxi, China. Mao (2007:129) reports a total of approximately 4,000 speakers.

Classification
The classification of Younuo within Hmongic  is uncertain, although it may be more closely related to Pa-Hng or She. According to Mao (2007), Younuo is most closely related to Pa-Hng, and forms a branch with it. However, Hsiu's (2015, 2018) computational phylogenetic study classifies Younuo as more closely related to She, Jiongnai, and Pana.

Demographics
Like Pa-Hng speakers, the Younuo are also called "Red Yao" 红瑶, which can refer to various Yao groups speaking different languages. Younuo speakers are also called Shanhua Red Yao 山话红瑶, and number about 4,600 people. Their neighbors, the Pinghua Red Yao 平话红瑶, speak a Pinghua dialect related to the Chinese varieties of Guibei Pinghua 桂北平话 and Shaozhou Tuhua, and number just over 10,000 people (Mao 2007).

Distribution
Younuo is spoken in Heping township (和平乡), Longsheng Various Nationalities Autonomous County, Guangxi, China, in the villages of Liutian 柳田 (including Xiaozhai 小寨), Jinjiang 金江, Xinlu 新禄, Jinkeng 金坑 (including Huangluo 黄落), and a few others (Mao 2007:129). The Red Yao of Longsheng County are also distributed in Sishui 泗水, Madi 马堤, and Jiangdi 江底 townships.

References

External links
 Mao Zongwu [毛宗武]. 2007. Younuo yu yan jiu (A Study of Younuo) [优诺语研究]. Beijing: Ethnic Publishing House [民族出版社].
 Sealang.net
 ABVD: Younuo (Xiaozhai) word list
 Younuo basic lexicon at the Global Lexicostatistical Database

Hmongic languages
Languages of China